King William may refer to:

People

Bimbia
 William I of Bimbia (died before 1878)
 William II of Bimbia (died 1889)

British Isles
 William I of England (c. 1066–1087), better known as William the Conqueror 
 William II of England (c. 1087–1100)
 William I, King of the Scots (c. 1143–1214), known as William the Lion
 William III of England and Ireland, and William II of Scotland (1650–1702), known as William of Orange
 William IV of the United Kingdom (1765–1837)
 A possible future regnal name for William, Prince of Wales, using his own name, would be King William V

German Empire
 William II of Holland (1227–1256), elected King of the Romans in 1247
 William I, German Emperor and King of Prussia (1797–1888); also spelled Wilhelm
 Wilhelm II, German Emperor and King of Prussia (1859–1941); also spelled William

The Netherlands
 William I of the Netherlands (1772–1843)
 William II of the Netherlands (1792–1849)
 William III of the Netherlands (1817–1890)

Sicily
 William I of Sicily (1131–1166)
 William II of Sicily (1166–1189)
 William III of Sicily (1190–1198)

Places
 King William, Virginia

See also
 King William Street (disambiguation)
 William (disambiguation)
 William King (disambiguation)
 King William's March, a piece by the English composer Jeremiah Clarke
 King William Ale House, a pub in King Street, Bristol, United Kingdom